Samartín is a parish  in Amieva, a municipality within the province and autonomous community of Asturias, in northern Spain.

The population is 190 (INE 2011). The postal code is 33558.

Villages

References

Parishes in Amieva